Alzheimer's Story is a book written by Saudi Arabian author, Ghazi Abdul Rahman Al Gosaibi, published in 2010 right after his death.

The book is a collection of letters that Yaqoob, diagnosed with Alzheimer's disease, writes for his wife while being far away from her and his family, living in a shelter aimed to provide care for this purpose. And despite the sense of narration found within the book, its primary objective is to provide information about Alzheimer's and how it is like for people diagnosed with it.

Main Idea & Plot  
The author dedicates his book to people diagnosed with Alzheimer's. He starts it off with narrating the story of Yaqoob who forgot the name of Nermeen's, his wife, favourite perfume when he went to the store to buy her one. Feeling embarrassed, he promises the store lady to come back after he has written the name of the perfume on a piece of paper. 

Before Yaqoob got diagnosed, he tended to slowly forget stuff around him, like the names of his children. His wife realised that he needed a vacation in the US. When he went there, he visited a doctor who eventually told him he had Alzheimer's, and now he stays in a shelter, not exactly a shelter, as he describes it, but rather a mix of a shelter, hotel, and "everything else" containing well-trained medics. 

Throughout the days, Yaqoob explains to his wife that Alzheimer's is originally the name of Alois Alzheimer, the one who discovered the disease while dealing with a patient in 1906. And before the disease gets its name, Arabs used to call it "senility or foolishness", until the symptoms were discovered in a relatively young patient, as senility tends to be more common in old people. 

In addition, Yaqoob elucidates the feelings of depression that crawl upon Alzheimer's patients, including himself, as he worries about losing his dearest memories to him, including his wife, children, and happy moments. He elucidates, through a book he has read called Death in Slow-motion, how living with Alzheimer's is even worse than death, as a completely different identity invades the person, "claiming to be him". 

He expressed how much he wanted a hidden power such as of faith, to beat Alzheimer's, depicting how faith has always caused positive evolutions; as Arabs with faith were behind the rise of the Islamic Civilisation, and Romans with faith were behind the rise of the Roman Empire, and Persians with faith were behind the rise of the Persian Empire. 

Throughout the letters, Yaqoob updates his wife about his situation, updating her at some point that he received treatment regarding the bad memories he gets, yet there was a huge bad memory to him that seemed to attack concerning his teenagerhood, which tended to open up a topic about teenagerhood and the theory of teenagerhood that was not logical at all to him. Moreover, he describes how the memories of "first moments" were piling up in his head, and he was speaking of it with a lady named Elizabet, asking her about her experience with it, and how she usually only forgets about her "last time moments" rather than the first moments. 

And apart from informing his wife about Alzheimer's, Yaqoob also documents the conversations he had with the people he stays with in the shelter. He narrated a conversation with movie star, Jeffrey Borez, where they spoke about their memories, including Jeffrey acting with several ladies, moving onto his four love experiences, along with Yaqoob's love experiences. 

Eventually, though, both tend to forget what happened in their fourth and second love experiences, so they look at each other, nervously, and make up an excuse to keep things for next time. And back in the letters, Yaqoob desperately writes to his wife how much this depresses him and drives him crazy trying so hard to remember what happened during his second marriage. 

In the final letter, Yaqoob informs his wife about the results of a meeting he was involved in, where he learnt about the different stages of Alzheimer's, and the disease does not have a definite cure. He along with others were currently in the first level still far from other levels, which involved getting into a condition of dereliction, where one does not know how to do simple tasks on his own, after he has already passed the level of forgetting appointments, not noticing the passing of time, and not remembering memories that are not yet far. 

Yaqoob depressingly expresses how people often flounce away from others with disabilities, pointing out to how this will be his case anytime soon despite him previously being one of these people. He also said that the disease makes ones' brain like a vegetable, in which he would rather die than have his brain become like that. 

The author concludes the letters with one sent to Nermeen, his wife, from Yaqoob's doctor informing her about Yaqoob's death resulting from a heart attack, in which it has no relation with his Alzheimer's.

Quotes 
"Do more than the bad stuff possibly exist? Aren't the bad stuff we experience in childhood a reason for the suffering that stays with us for the rest of our lives?"

"Love stories that did not work out well, financial issues, work issues, diseases, betrayals, losing loved ones; aren't all these things that we would love to forget?"

Reviews 
Abdulaziz Al Muzeni said about Alzheimer's Story that it is a series of literary pieces moving the readers between the aspects of politics, literature, economics, social and philosophical reflections, along with daring and sometimes hidden proposal of certain thoughts.

He added the book also takes the reader on a journey revolving around bitterness to joy, and from joy to sadness, in artistic ways. 

Moreover, Hanan Aal Saif points out to the satirical writing that the author uses while narrating the details of the book, along with getting into the concepts of freedom, void, love, and death.

And Jehad Fadel mentions that Al Gosaibi had a rich, abundant amount of ideas expressed in the book that focus on the psychology of people with Alzheimer's

References

External Links 
https://en.wikibooks.org/wiki/Exercise_as_it_relates_to_Disease/Exercise_and_its_effects_on_preventing_Alzheimer%27s_disease 
Alzheimer's disease
Alzheimer's Foundation of America

2010 fiction books
Books about Alzheimer's disease
Saudi Arabian books
21st-century Arabic books